North American Plains Animals, is a series of public sculptures by American artist William E. Arnold, located on the grounds of the Indianapolis Zoo in Indianapolis, Indiana, United States. The series of eight animals, all made of barbed wire, are located throughout the grounds of the Indianapolis Zoo. Each sculpture is representative of an animal indigenous to the North American plains, including a bear, bison, whitetail deer, ram, eagle, and caribou.

Information

In past years the animals were oriented toward the Old National Road/US-40, visible to passing traffic. Currently they are scattered throughout the grounds. The bear is located near the entrance to the White River Gardens. A bison is located between the Desert Biome and North Pavilion. The eagle, ram and deer can be viewed while on the Zoo's train ride. The eagle, which has outspread wings and is positioned on a wooden post, is with the deer behind the giraffe exhibit. The caribou are used in a Christmas display on Monument Circle in downtown Indianapolis. All of the animals were created before or during 1988 in preparation for the opening of the Indianapolis Zoo in June 1988.

See also
 American Bison (sculpture)

References

External links
Save Outdoor Sculpture!

1988 sculptures
Outdoor sculptures in Indianapolis
Sculpture series
Steel sculptures in Indiana
Sculptures of bears
Bison in art
Deer in art
Birds in art
1988 establishments in Indiana
Sheep in art
White River State Park